{{Infobox company
| name = Those Characters from Cleveland, LLC
| trade_name = Cloudco Entertainment
| former_name = American Greetings Entertainment (2015–2018)AG Properties (until 2015)Those Characters from Cleveland (1981–late 90s)
| logo = File:Cloudco logo.png
| type = Private
| genre = Children and family
| foundation = 1981; 41 years ago
| founder = Tom Wilson
| industry = Entertainment, Licensing, Creative Services, Marketing, Social Media, Digital/Games
| hq_location = Los Angeles, California
| members = 11-50 employees
| products = Boy Girl Dog Cat Mouse CheeseBuddy ThunderstruckCare BearsHolly HobbieTinpo
| subsid = CloudCo, LLC
| owner = Weiss family
| website = http://www.cloudcoentertainment.com/
}}
Those Characters from Cleveland, LLC, officially trading as Cloudco Entertainment and formerly AG Properties and American Greetings Entertainment, is an American company which formerly traded as American Greetings' former character brand division. Properties owned by the company include Care Bears, Holly Hobbie, Madballs, Buddy Thunderstruck, Tinpo, The Get Along Gang and Boy Girl Dog Cat Mouse Cheese.

 History 
As Those Characters from Cleveland (1980s)
Holly Hobbie premiered in 1967 as a line of greeting cards by American Greetings. Knickerbocker Toy Co. manufactured stuffed Holly Hobbie dolls from 1968 to 1983. The character's public appeal led to the formation of Those Characters From Cleveland, Inc. In 1972, the company introduced Ziggy, created by Tom Wilson, which soon had a newspaper cartoon strip generating significant additional income. Universal Press later purchased the creative rights. By 1977, Holly Hobbie became one of the top female licensed character in the world.

Those Characters From Cleveland was started up by Tom Wilson on behalf of American Greetings in 1981 to handle its licensing business. The first property out of Those Characters was Strawberry Shortcake, which generated in 1981 $500 million in retail sales, followed by the Care Bears with $2 billion in sales over its first two year. The Care Bears were announced in 1982 with M.A.D., Marketing and Design Service of the toy group of General Mills, and launched in Spring 1983 with toys with a syndicated TV special.

With Topps' 1985 Garbage Pail Kids trading card series release, Ralph Shaffer, senior vice-president and creative head at From Cleveland, created the Madballs, balls with disfigured faces. AmToy, another American Greetings subsidiary, released them as toys in 1986 and reached the #4 on toy best-seller list by September of that year.

With Mattel, Those Characters From Cleveland had launched the Popples in 1986. in 1986. In 1987, Those Characters came out with four plush variants that do more than just be huggable but playable to be introduced in 1988 through three toy companies.

As AG Properties (2000s-2015)
AG Properties in 2001 named DIC Entertainment as the licensing agent for Strawberry Shortcake.

With DIC merging with Cookie Jar thus transfers the rights, the company sued. In the settlement, AG agreed to sell Shortcake, the Care Bears and the Sushi Pack crime-fighting characters to Cookie Jar for $195 million with payment due September 30, 2008. Cookie Jar could not come up with the financing, but continued to claim to have Shortcake licensing rights. AG found a new buyer of Shortcake and the Bears in MoonScoop, while settling with Cookie Jar with AG to buy out its rights to Shortcake. MoonScoop was to pay part of the purchases price to allow AG to pay Cookie Jar for its rights. Missing that deadline, AG back out of the deal as MoonScoop attempt to complete the deal by the full payment deadline of June 7, 2009. MoonScoop sued with American Greetings winning the case in November 2012.

AG Properties by September 19, 2012 became global licensing agent for Pūkeko Pictures’ The WotWots as they sublicensed the property to EXIM Licensing Group in the Latin America region, Segal Licensing in Canada, Stella Projects in the Australian and New Zealand region.

Sean Gorman was promoted to president of AG Properties in June 2013 with the mandate to add boy franchises. Gorman was hired in 2007 as vice president, entertainment production and development.

In 2006, senior designer Jeff Harter pitched Packages from Planet X and Boy Girl Dog Cat Mouse Cheese to AG Properties. Packages from Planet X eventually was licensed and produced for Disney XD by DHX Media in Vancouver and Disney and premiered on July 13, 2013. Boy Girl Dog Cat Mouse Cheese would spend many years in development before CBBC and Gulli co-commissioned the series in October 2018, which is co-produced with Watch Next Media in France and Kavaleer Productions in Ireland, and premiered on October 31, 2019. In January 2012, American Greetings Properties and Exim Licensing Group international licensing agent signed a Holly Hobbie publishing deal with V & R Editoras for most of Latin America and the Caribbean.

AG Properties had licensed Lion Forge Comics the Care Bears, Madball and Packages from Planet X for titles under their Roar Comics all-ages imprint for release in late 2014.

On February 3, 2015, Iconix Brand Group signed a definitive agreement to acquire the Strawberry Shortcake brand and related intangible assets from AG Properties for US$105 million. DHX Media (now WildBrain) would eventually acquire the franchise in 2017 as part of their buyout of Iconix's entertainment assets, which also included an 80% majority stake in Peanuts owner Peanuts Worldwide.

As American Greetings Entertainment (2015-18)
On October 6, 2015, American Greetings changed the unit's name to American Greetings Entertainment as an indication of a shift in focus to the Care Bears property, alongside additional multi-character and entertainment properties. On October 11th, the newly-renamed company announced Buddy Thunderstruck, a stop-motion animated series co-produced with Stoopid Buddy Stoodios that would premiere on Netflix in 2017.

In May 2016, irish production company Sixteen South named American Greetings Entertainment the worldwide distributor of Claude, an animated TV Adaptation of Alex T. Smith's bestselling picture book series. On October 17, 2016, the company announced a partnership with Gaumont Animation to relaunch Herself the Elf with a new television series that the two companies would co-develop, co-produce and co-distribute.

On October 13, 2017, UK pre-school broadcaster CBeebies greenlit a Tinpo television series, which would be co-produced by Dentsu, OLM Digital and Sprite Animation Studios, for a late 2018 release on the network.

In April 2018, Hulu commissioned a Holly Hobbie live action TV series by Aircraft Pictures. In May 2018, an advert showcased at the Licensing Expo showcased new redesigns of the Care Bears for a new television series that would premiere in Late-2018.

As Cloudco Entertainment (2018-present)
On April 6, 2018, the Weiss family announced it was to sell the majority shareholding in American Greetings to US investment company, Clayton Dubilier & Rice. The ownership of American Greetings Entertainment was fully retained by the Weiss family, and so on August 28, 2018, the company was spun off from American Greetings as Cloudco Entertainment, becoming a stand-alone company. The previous management was retained, including president Sean Gorman.

On September 6th, the planned new Care Bears animated series previously previewed at the licensing expo would be called Care Bears: Unlock the Magic and would premiere on the Boomerang SVOD service in January 2019. On September 20, 2018, Cloudco announced they had opened up an UK office. 

On June 24, 2019, Warner Music Group's Arts Music division launched the licensed Cloudco Entertainment label with the release of the current Holly Hobbie TV show theme song as a part of a multi-season deal.

In January 2021, Cloudco announced they would team up with Topps to create a new toy range that crosses over Cloudco's Madballs and Topps' Garbage Pail Kids franchises. On March 16, 2021, Cloudco and Marblemedia announced they would team-up to co-produce a new live-action comedy series called Overlord and the Underwoods. On the same day, it was confirmed that the show had been picked up by Nickelodeon internationally, ITV in the United Kingdom, CBC in Canada and BYUtv in the United States.

In October 2022, it was announced that Cloudco would be co-producing the Disney Channel and Disney+ series Pretty Freekin Scary in co-production with CakeStart Entertainment, a joint venture between Cake Entertainment and JumpStart Entertainment, as part of the latter's first-look deal with Disney.

 Properties 
Current
 Boy Girl Dog Cat Mouse Cheese (2006)
 Buddy Thunderstruck (2015, co-created with Stoopid Buddy Stoodios)
 Care Bears (1981)
 The Care Bear Cousins
 The Get Along Gang (1983)
 Holly Hobbie (1967)
 Holly Hobbie & Friends (2005)
 Herself the Elf
 Lady Lovely Locks (1987)
 Madballs (1985)
 Maryoku Yummy (2001)
 Overlord and the Underwoods (2021)
 Packages from Planet X (2006)
 Sushi Pack (2006)
 Tinpo (2007)
 Twisted Whiskers (2001)                                                                                                                 

Ownership Unknown
 Brush-a-Loves (1987)
 FlopaLots (1987)
 Nosy Bears (1987)
 Peppermint Rose (1990)
 Special Blessings (1987)

Sold
 My Pet Monster (1986) - Sold to Saban Brands in 2012, now owned by Entertainment One/Hasbro.
 Popples (1986) - introduced with Mattel, sold to Saban Brands in 2012, now owned by Entertainment One/Hasbro.
 Strawberry Shortcake (1980) - sold to Iconix Brand Group in 2015, now owned by WildBrain.
 The Berrykins - Strawberry Shortcake's little forest pals
 Ziggy (1972) - Sold off in 2011.

 Television shows 
 As Those Characters from Cleveland 
 The Get Along Gang (1984, co-production with DIC Audiovisuel)
 Care Bears (1985, co-production with DIC Audiovisuel and LBS Communications)
 The Care Bears Family (1986–88, co-production with Nelvana)
 My Pet Monster (1986-88, co-production with Nelvana)
 Popples (1986–1988, co-production with DIC Enterprises)
 Lady Lovely Locks (1987, co-production with DIC Enterprises)
 Ring Raiders (1989, co-production with DIC Enterprises)
 As AG Properties/American Greetings Entertainment 
 Strawberry Shortcake (2003–08, co-production with DIC Entertainment Corporation)
 Care Bears: Adventures in Care-a-lot (2007–08, co-production with SD Entertainment)
 Tinpo Shorts (2007–08)
 Sushi Pack (2007–09, co-production with Studio Espinosa, Tom Ruegger Productions, CloudCo, Inc., The Hatchery, LLC, DIC Entertainment Corporation (Season 1) and Cookie Jar Entertainment (Season 2)
 Strawberry Shortcake's Berry Bitty Adventures (2010–15, co-production with MoonScoop Group)
 Maryoku Yummy (2010, co-production with DQ Entertainment and Telegael)
 The Twisted Whiskers Show (2010, co-production with DQ Entertainment, MoonScoop, LLC, CloudCo, Inc., and Telegael)
 Care Bears: Welcome to Care-a-Lot (2012, co-production with MoonScoop Group)
 Packages from Planet X (2013–14, co-production with DHX Media)
 Care Bears & Cousins (2015–16, co-production with Splash Entertainment)
 Buddy Thunderstruck (2017, co-production with Stoopid Buddy Stoodios)

 As Cloudco Entertainment 
 Holly Hobbie (2018–present, co-production with Aircraft Pictures)
 Tinpo (2018–present, co-production with Dentsu, Sprite Entertainment and OLM Digital)
 Care Bears: Unlock the Magic (2019–present, co-production with Copernicus Studios and Boomerang)
 Boy Girl Dog Cat Mouse Cheese (2019–present, co-production with WatchNext Media and Kavaleer Productions)
 Overlord and the Underwoods (2021-present, co-production with Marblemedia and Canfro Productions)
 Pretty Freekin Scary (2023, co-production with CakeStart Entertainment and Disney Channel)

 Television specials/movies 
 The World of Strawberry Shortcake (1980, co-production with Muller/Rosen, Murakami-Wolf-Swenson, Toei Doga and RLR Associates)
 Strawberry Shortcake in Big Apple City (1981, co-production with Muller/Rosen, Perpetual Motion Pictures and RLR Associates)
 Strawberry Shortcake: Pets on Parade (1982, co-production with Muller/Rosen, Murakami-Wolf-Swenson and Toei Doga)
 Strawberry Shortcake: Housewarming Surprise (1983, co-production with MAD Productions and Nelvana)
 The Magic of Herself the Elf (1983, co-production with Nelvana and Scholastic Entertainment)
 The Care Bears in the Land Without Feelings (1983, co-production with Atkinson Film-Arts)
 Strawberry Shortcake and the Baby Without a Name (1984, co-production with MAD Productions and Nelvana)
 The Care Bears Battle the Freeze Machine (1984, co-production with Atkinson Film-Arts and MAD Productions)
 The Get Along Gang (1984, co-production with Nelvana)
 Strawberry Shortcake Meets the Berrykins (1985, co-production with Nelvana)
 Care Bears Nutcracker Suite (1987, co-production with Nelvana)
 Peppermint Rose (1993, co-production with Muller Stratford Productions)

 Theatrical movies 
 The Care Bears Movie (1985, produced by Nelvana, distributed by The Samuel Goldwyn Company)
 Care Bears Movie II: A New Generation (1986, produced by Nelvana and LBS Communications, distributed by Columbia Pictures)
 The Care Bears Adventure in Wonderland (1987, produced by Nelvana, distributed by Cineplex Odeon Films)
 Strawberry Shortcake: The Sweet Dreams Movie (2006, produced by DIC Entertainment Corporation, distributed by Kidtoon Films and 20th Century Fox Home Entertainment)
 Care Bears: Oopsy Does It! (2007, produced by SD Entertainment and The Hatchery, distributed by Kidtoon Films and 20th Century Fox Home Entertainment)
 Care Bears: Share Bear Shines (2010, produced by SD Entertainment, distributed by Kidtoon Films and Lionsgate Home Entertainment)

 Direct-to-video specials/movies 
 Madballs: Escape from Orb (1986, produced by Nelvana, distributed by Hi-Tops Video)
 Madballs: Gross Jokes (1987, produced by Nelvana, distributed by Hi-Tops Video)
 Care Bears: Journey to Joke-a-lot (2004, produced by Nelvana, Sparx Animation Studios and Mainframe Entertainment, distributed by Lionsgate Home Entertainment)
 The Care Bears' Big Wish Movie (2005, produced by Nelvana and Crest Animation Productions, distributed by Lionsgate Home Entertainment)
 Holly Hobbie and Friends: Surprise Party (2006, produced by Wang Film Productions and Nickelodeon, distributed by Paramount Home Entertainment)
 Holly Hobbie and Friends: Christmas Wishes  (2006, produced by Wang Film Productions and Nickelodeon, distributed by Paramount Home Entertainment)
 Holly Hobbie and Friends: Secret Adventures (2007, produced by Wang Film Productions and Nickelodeon, distributed by Paramount Home Entertainment)
 Holly Hobbie and Friends: Best Friends Forever (2007, produced by Wang Film Productions and Nickelodeon, distributed by Sony Pictures Home Entertainment)
 Holly Hobbie and Friends: Fabulous Fashion Show (2008, produced by Sunflower Productions, Cartoonuity, and Nelvana, distributed by Sony Pictures Home Entertainment)
 Holly Hobbie and Friends: Marvelous Makeover (2009,  produced by Sunflower Productions, Cartoonuity, and Nelvana, distributed by Sony Pictures Home Entertainment)
 The Strawberry Shortcake Movie: Sky's the Limit (2009, produced by MoonScoop Group, distributed by 20th Century Fox Home Entertainment)
 Care Bears: To the Rescue (2009, produced by SD Entertainment, distributed by Lionsgate Home Entertainment)
 Care Bears: The Giving Festival'' (2010, produced by SD Entertainment, distributed by Lionsgate Home Entertainment)

References

External links 
 

American Greetings
Privately held companies based in Ohio
Privately held companies based in California
Entertainment companies of the United States